Stranger in the Mirror may refer to:

A Stranger in the Mirror, 1976 novel by Sidney Sheldon
The Stranger in the Mirror: Dissociation – The Hidden Epidemic, 2001 book by Marlene Steinberg and Maxine Schnall

See also
Stranger in My Mirror